The Avar–Andic languages form one of the seven main branches of Northeast Caucasian language family. It branches into the Andic languages and the Avar language. The latter, with 800,000 speakers, serves as a literary language for 60,000 speakers of the Andic branch as well as for speakers of the related Tsezic (Didoic) languages.

The table below shows regional dialects encompassed in the Avar-Andic languages, as well as other language groups in the Northeast Caucasian language family. Included are the Andic language, Akhvakh language, Bagvalal language, Botlikh language, Chamalal language, Godoberi language, Karata language, Tindi language, and Avar language.

See also 
 Languages of the Caucasus

References 

Northeast Caucasian languages